...One Third of a Nation... is a 1939 American drama film directed by Dudley Murphy and written by Oliver H.P. Garrett and Dudley Murphy. The film stars Sylvia Sidney, Leif Erickson, Myron McCormick, Hiram Sherman, the future director Sidney Lumet and Muriel Hutchison. The film was released on February 10, 1939, by Paramount Pictures.

Plot
When a fire breaks out in a run-down tenement in New York City, a young boy named Joey Rogers (Sidney Lumet) attempts to flee using a fire escape. It collapses due to ill repair, and Joey is severely injured. Joey's much older sister, Mary (Sylvia Sidney), rushes him to the hospital with the help of wealthy Peter Cortlant (Leif Erickson), who pays for Joey's medical bills on the spot. Cortlant is told by his business manager (Percy Waram) that he owns the building where the fire occurred.

The local district attorney investigates the fire, and tells Mary that the tenement's age means it was exempt from modern building safety codes. Since no tenants complained about the building before the fire, no crime has been committed. When Cortlant visits the tenement, he is warned to stay away from Mary by Mary's boyfriend, Sam (Myron McCormick).

Mary is upset when she learns that Cortlant owned her building. She removes Joey from the hospital. Crippled and suffering from delusions that the building is talking to him, Joey vows revenge on the tenement. Mary meets with Cortlant, and convinces him to turn his decrepit tenements into public housing and rebuild them. Appalled at the cost, Cortlant's sister, Ethel (Muriel Hutchison), tries to blackmail Cortlant into stopping the project by telling the press that he's having an affair with Mary.

Joey dies after setting fire to the tenement. Sam tells Cortlant that he will marry Mary to avoid scandal, which allows Cortlant to proceed with his plan.

Cast 
Sylvia Sidney as Mary Rogers 
Leif Erickson as Peter Cortlant 
Myron McCormick as Sam Moon
Hiram Sherman as Donald Hinchley
Sidney Lumet as Joey Rogers
Muriel Hutchison as Ethel Cortlant
Percy Waram as Arthur Mather
Otto Hulett as Assistant District Attorney 
Horace Sinclair as John
Iris Adrian as Myrtle
Charles Dingle as Mr. Rogers
Edmonia Nolley as Mrs. Rogers
Hugh Cameron as Mr. Cassidy
Julia Fassett as Mrs. Cassidy
Baruch Lumet as Mr. Rosen
Byron Russell as Insp. Castle
Robert George as Building Inspector
Wayne Nunn as Insp. Waller
Max Hirsch as Mr. Cohen 
Miriam Goldina as Mrs. Cohen
Bea Hendricks as Min
William Pote as Jim
Stan Harper as harmonica player (uncredited)

Production
It was the last feature film shot at Astoria Studios in New York until its reopening in the 1970s.

References

External links 
 

1939 films
Paramount Pictures films
American drama films
1939 drama films
Films directed by Dudley Murphy
American black-and-white films
Films scored by Nathaniel Shilkret
1930s English-language films
1930s American films